Jathekey (Urdu: جیٹھیکے) is a village of Sialkot District in the Punjab province of Pakistan. It is located in the North-West of the Sambrial and lies 2 km away from Sambrial. Jathekey is one of the biggest villages of Sialkot among 161 villages.

Location

Jathekey is located in North-West of Sambrial and lies 2 km away from north end of Sialkot Lahore Motorway, 4 km away from Sialkot Dry Port and 8 km away from Sialkot International Airport. It is located at 32.16°N 74.40°E.The nearest railway station is 3 km away (Sambrial railway station). Export Processing Zone Is Situated in South Of Village and Famous Stream Nala Palkhu Flows in North of village.

Sectors/Mohalla
Jathekey East
Jathekey West
Palkhu
Nangrawala
Haiderpura

Climate
Jathekey is cold during winters and hot and humid during summers. May and June are the hottest months. The temperature during winter may drop to 0 °C. The land is, generally, plain and fertile. Most of the rain falls during the Monsoon season in summer which often results in flooding.

Union Council Jathekey
Jathekey is capital of UC Jathekey. Total number of registered voters in union council is 11,000. Union council consists of following villages:
Jathekey
Haddokey
Kalokey
Majra Kalaan

Education
Jathekey has a very good literacy rate. It has 1 Government high school for boys and 2 Government primary school for girls, it also has a college and number of private schools and tuition academies. Mostly people preferred to study in Sambrial or Sialkot.

Administration

Villages in Sialkot District